Moía Mané (born 5 November 1987) is a Guinea-Bissauan international footballer who plays for Portuguese team Serzedelo, as a defensive midfielder.

Career
Born in Bissau, Mané has played club football in Guinea-Bissau, Cape Verde, and Portugal for Sporting Clube de Bissau, Boavista Praia, Sporting Covilhã, Praiense, Atlético Reguengos and Serzedelo.

He made his senior international debut for Guinea-Bissau in 2010.

References

1987 births
Living people
Bissau-Guinean footballers
Guinea-Bissau international footballers
Sporting Clube de Bissau players
Boavista FC (Cape Verde) players
S.C. Covilhã players
S.C. Praiense players
Atlético S.C. players
G.D. Serzedelo players
Association football midfielders
Bissau-Guinean expatriate footballers
Bissau-Guinean expatriate sportspeople in Cape Verde
Expatriate footballers in Cape Verde
Bissau-Guinean expatriate sportspeople in Portugal
Expatriate footballers in Portugal